is the first mini-album by Fujifabric, released in October 2002 under the independent Japanese record label Song-Crux.

Track listing 
EP (Cat.No: RTSC-002)

References 

Fujifabric albums
2002 EPs